Señorita Panamá 2019 was the 53rd Señorita Panamá pageant. It selected the national representatives to the Miss Universe, Miss International, and Miss Grand International competitions. This was the fourth edition of the renewed Señorita Panama pageant, under the direction of Cesar Anel Rodríguez, who took charge of the national event in 2016. Twenty-four preliminary contestants were selected from throughout Panama and competed for the crown.

The 2019 edition was held, for the second year in a row, at the Roberto Durán Arena in Panama City on June 20, 2018. Señorita Panamá 2018 Rosa Montezuma of Comarcas crowned Mehr Eliezer of Isla Flamenco as her successor at the end of the event.

Representatives to Miss International and Miss Grand International was also elected. Shirel Ortiz of Panamá Centro crowned Betzaida Rodriguez of  Los Santos as Miss Panama International 2019 and Gabriela Mornhinweg of Panamá Centro crowned Carmen Drayton of Portobelo as Miss Panama Grand International 2019.

Eliezer competed in Miss Universe 2019, the 68th Miss Universe pageant. Rodriguez represented Panama in Miss International 2019, while Drayton represented Panama in Miss Grand International 2019. Drayton was recently crowned as the 3rd runner-up at the Miss Grand International 2019 competition.

Due to COVID-19 pandemic on 9 April 2020 the Señorita Panamá Organization announced Carmen Jaramillo as the Señorita Panamá for the 2020 and will represent her country in the Miss Universe 2020, the 69th Miss Universe pageant.

Results

Placements

Special awards

Special guests

Reigning Miss International Mariem Velazco of Venezuela served as a judge during the finals.  Miss Universe 2005 Natalie Glebova also attended, and served as a judge.

Costume selection
This year the contestant, was celebrated in a private casting. It is a competition showing the country's wealth embodied in the colorful and fascinating costumes made by Panamenian designers combining the past and present of Panama. The winner costume represent Panamá in Miss Universe 2019.

Preliminary competition
A preliminary competition was held on 11 May 2019 at Balboa Theater.  The 24 contestants were scored in the categories of swimsuit, talent and overall beauty.  These scores will carry over to the finals to be held on June 20.
Personal Interview: Two days before the finals, the 24 contestants faced the panel of judges for personal interviews.

Judges
Natalie Glebova: Miss Universe 2005. (Canada)
Matt Rich: Public relations executive. (New York, United States)
Jean Shafiroff: Philanthropist, writer and socialite. (New York, United States)
Tui Pranich: International designer. (Thailand)
Exidio Junior Zelaya: Honduran journalist. (Honduras)
Jenia Nenzen: Journalist & Miss Panamá International 1989. (Panamá)
George Wittels: Goldsmith International. (Austria / Venezuela)
Javier Gómez: Fashion photographer. (Panamá - New York, United States)
José Espino: Plastic surgeon. (Panamá)
Sarita Esses: Social communicator. (Panamá)
Shivam Maharaj: Sacha Cosmetics International director. (Trinidad & Tobago)
Marcio Oliveira: Vizzano footwear sales Manager. (Brazil)
Michele Sage: Señorita Panamá 1994. (Panamá)
Michael Pistinos: Businessman. (New York, United States)
Jackie Carvalho: Businesswoman. (New York, United States)
Dean Kelly Junior: Mister Panamá 2001. (Panamá)
Maricarmen Saavedra: Publicist and marketing manager. (Panamá)
Myriam Barría McGorman: Public relations and tourism promoter. (Panamá - New York, United States)

Official contestants 
These are the competitors who have been selected this year.

Notes

Miss Bocas del Toro, Angie Keith, competed in "Miss Supranational 2015" held in Poland, where she placed in the Top 10 finalists and won the title of "Miss Supranational Americas".
Miss Darien, Leydis Gonzalez, competed in Miss Panamá 2015 and  "Miss Supranational 2016" held in Poland, where she placed in the Top 25 semi-finalists.
Miss Panama Este, Carmen Jaramillo, competed in Miss Panamá 2014 as Miss Panama Oeste and "Miss Earth 2015" held in Austria.  She was unplaced.  Jaramillo was also a contestant in "Reina Hispanoamericana" held in Bolivia that same year.  She placed in the Top 7 finalists.
Miss Chiriquí, Krysthelle Barreto Reichlin, competed in Miss World Panamá 2019 as Miss Panama Centro and represented the country in Miss Supranational 2019, she placed in top 10.

References

External links
Panamá 2019 official website

Señorita Panamá
Panama
2019 in Panama